Marcela Carvajal (born 28 June 1969) is a Colombian actress mostly recognized in her native country for her roles in telenovelas. Carvajal was born in Bogotá, and she has done theater studies in Paris and Bogotá. In 1999 she traveled to New York, where she studied filmmaking and made the film El hombre de mi vida (English: "The Man of My Life").

On stage she has outstanding in her native country for plays such as The Vagina Monologues, and The Lover.

Filmography

Film roles

Television roles

References

External links 
 

Colombian telenovela actresses
Living people
People from Bogotá
20th-century Colombian actresses
21st-century Colombian actresses
1969 births